Following is a table of United States presidential elections in North Dakota, ordered by year. Since its admission to statehood in 1889, North Dakota has participated in every U.S. presidential election.

Winners of the state are in bold. The shading refers to the state winner, and not the national winner.

See also
 Elections in North Dakota

Notes

References